Tamposi is a surname. Notable people with the surname include:

Ali Tamposi (born 1989), American songwriter
Elizabeth M. Tamposi (born 1955), American politician and diplomat
Samuel A. Tamposi (1924–1995), American real estate developer